Happy Holidays: I Love the Winter Weather is a 1999 compilation album of seasonal songs recorded by American singer Jo Stafford. It was released by Corinthian Records, the label founded by Stafford and her husband Paul Weston on October 12, 1999.

The album contains recordings that originally appeared on Stafford's Columbia Records LPs Happy Holiday (1955) and Ski Trails (1956).

Track listing

 "Happy Holiday"	 	
 "Winter Weather"		 	
 "Sleigh Ride"		 	
 "By the Fireside"		 	
 "I've Got My Love to Keep Me Warm"	 	
 "Jingle Bells"/"Winter Wonderland"		 	
 "Toyland"	 	
 "'Twas the Night Before Christmas"		 	
 "March of the Toys"
 "The Christmas Song"		 	
 "I Wonder as I Wander"		 	
 "O Little Town of Bethlehem"		 	
 "Silent Night"		 	
 "Hanover Winter Song"		 	
 "It Happened in Sun Valley"		 	
 "June in January"		 	
 "The Whiffenpoof Song"	 	
 "Baby, It's Cold Outside"		 	
 "The Nearness of You" 	
 "Let It Snow! Let It Snow! Let It Snow!"		 	
 "Moonlight in Vermont"		 	
 "Happy Holiday" (reprise)

References

1999 compilation albums
Jo Stafford compilation albums
1999 Christmas albums
Corinthian Records compilation albums
Christmas compilation albums
Christmas albums by American artists
Pop Christmas albums